LGA 1155, also called Socket H2, is a zero insertion force flip-chip land grid array (LGA) CPU socket designed by Intel for their CPUs based on the Sandy Bridge (2nd Gen) and Ivy Bridge (3rd Gen) microarchitectures.

It is the successor of LGA 1156 (known as Socket H) and was itself succeeded by LGA 1150 in 2013. Along with selected variations of LGA 2011 socket, it was the last Intel socket to fully support Windows XP, Windows Server 2003, Windows Vista, and Windows Server 2008.

LGA 1155 has 1155 protruding pins to make contact with the pads on the processor. The pins are arranged in a 40×40 array with a 24×16 central void and additional 61 omitted pins (two adjoining the central void, six in each of the four corners, and 35 in groups around the perimeter), yielding the 1600 − 384 − 61 = 1155 pin count. Processors for LGA 1155 and LGA 1156 sockets are not compatible with each other since they have different socket notches.

LGA 1155 also marked the beginning of secure boot with support in some later boards.

Heatsink 
The 4 holes for fastening the heatsink to the motherboard are placed in a square with a lateral length of 75mm for Intel's sockets LGA 1156, LGA 1155, LGA 1150, LGA 1151 and LGA 1200. Cooling solutions should therefore be interchangeable.

Cooling systems are compatible between LGA 1155 and LGA 1156 sockets, as the processors have the same dimensions, profile and construction, and similar levels of heat production.

Sandy Bridge family of chipsets 

Sandy Bridge chipsets, except B65, Q65 and Q67, support both Sandy Bridge and Ivy Bridge CPUs through a BIOS upgrade. Sandy Bridge based processors officially support up to DDR3-1333 memory, however in practice speeds up to DDR3-2133 have been tested to work successfully.

The H61 chipset only supports one double-sided DIMM Memory module (RAM module) per memory-channel and therefore is limited to 16GB instead of the 32GB like the others support. On H61-based motherboards with four DIMM slots, only four single-sided DIMMs can be installed.

Ivy Bridge family of chipsets

All Ivy Bridge chipsets and motherboards support both Sandy Bridge and Ivy Bridge CPUs. Ivy Bridge based processors will officially support up to DDR3-1600, up from DDR3-1333 of Sandy Bridge. Some consumer Ivy Bridge chipsets will also allow overclocking of K-series processors.

NVMe 

A PCGHX user  wrote an article on the website  describing how to take UEFI modules from some Z97 motherboards and use them with an Z77-motherboard to make the latter support booting from an SSD using the NVM Express protocol, instead of the AHCI protocol. That article claims, the Z97 motherboards were the first to officially and fully support the NVMe protocol.

The mods described also work with P67, B75 and other Chipset motherboards.

Notes

References

External links 
 Intel desktop processor integration overview (LGA115x)

Intel CPU sockets